George Brettingham Sowerby III (16 September 1843 – 31 January 1921) was a British conchologist, publisher, and illustrator.

He, too, worked (like his father George Brettingham Sowerby II and his grandfather George Brettingham Sowerby I) on the Thesaurus Conchyliorium, a comprehensive, beautifully illustrated work on molluscs. He was colour blind, and thus his daughter did most of the colouring of his engravings.

External links
  Petit, R. E. (2009). George Brettingham Sowerby, I, II & III: their conchological publications and molluscan taxa. Zootaxa. 2189: 1–218

See also
Sowerby family

Conchologists
1843 births
1921 deaths